Pendrell Sound is a sound located in the Discovery Islands in British Columbia, Canada. The sound branches off from Waddington Channel and deeply incises East Redonda Island.

The northern limit of Pendrell Sound delineates part of the northern limit of the Salish Sea.

References

Landforms of the Discovery Islands
Sounds of British Columbia
Salish Sea